Gogaon is a census town in Raipur district in the Indian state of Chhattisgarh.

Demographics
 India census, Gogaon had a population of 10,453. Males constitute 53% of the population and females 47%. Gogaon has an average literacy rate of 56%, lower than the national average of 59.5%: male literacy is 67%, and female literacy is 43%. In Gogaon, 21% of the population is under 6 years of age.

References

Cities and towns in Raipur district